Jamie David Robson (born 19 December 1997) is a Scottish professional footballer who plays as a left-back for EFL League One club Forest Green Rovers. He made his first team debut in September 2015 for Dundee United and has also played for Brechin City on loan during 2016.

Early life
Robson was born in Perth on 19 December 1997 and attended Blairgowrie High School. In his youth football career he was attached to Dundee and Rangers, as well as playing for Coupar Angus Boys Club. He joined Dundee United as a youth player in 2011.

Playing career

Dundee United
Robson signed his first professional contract with Dundee United in June 2014 and made his first team debut on 22 September 2015 in a Scottish League Cup match against Dunfermline Athletic. In January 2016, he signed a new contract to tie him to Dundee United until 2018.

Robson joined League One team Brechin City on loan in March 2016, going on to make six appearances, scoring twice. After returning from loan in May 2016 following the end of Brechin's season, Robson was listed as a substitute in a Scottish Premiership match against Inverness Caledonian Thistle, in contravention of registration rules. The rule breach led to Dundee United being deducted three points and fined £30,000.

Robson scored his first goal for Dundee United on 20 August 2016, in a 3–0 home victory against Ayr United. 

On 7 August 2021, Robson scored the only goal of the game in Dundee United's 1–0 Scottish Premiership win over defending league champions Rangers, ending Rangers' 40-match unbeaten run in the competition which stretched back to March 2020. The BBC named Robson as Man of the Match.

Lincoln City
On 31 August 2021, Robson would join English EFL League One club, Lincoln City signing a long-term contract for an undisclosed fee. He would go on to make his debut away to Cambridge United.

Forest Green Rovers
On 6 January 2023, Robson joined League One rivals Forest Green Rovers for an undisclosed fee.

Career statistics

Honours
Dundee United
 Scottish Challenge Cup: 2016–17
 Scottish Championship: 2019–20

References

External links

Living people
1997 births
Footballers from Perth, Scotland
Scottish footballers
Association football fullbacks
Dundee United F.C. players
Brechin City F.C. players
Lincoln City F.C. players
Forest Green Rovers F.C. players
Scottish Professional Football League players
People educated at Blairgowrie High School
English Football League players